The Federacion de Radioaficionados de Cuba (FRC) (in English, Cuban Amateur Radio Federation) is a national non-profit organization for amateur radio enthusiasts in Cuba. The FRC claims that 98% of all Cuban amateur radio operators belong to the organization.  These members are organized in 180 local amateur radio clubs that are affiliated with the Federacion de Radioaficionados de Cuba.  Key membership benefits of FRC include a QSL bureau for those amateur radio operators in regular communications with other amateur radio operators in foreign countries and sponsorship of amateur radio operating awards and radio contests.  FRC acts as a liaison between Cuban amateur radio operators and Cuban regulatory authorities.  FRC is the national member society representing Cuba in the International Amateur Radio Union.

References 

Cuba
Clubs and societies in Cuba
Radio in Cuba
Organizations based in Havana